The FIL World Luge Championships 1997 took place in Igls, Austria for the third time after previously hosting the event in 1977 and 1987.

Men's singles

Women's singles

Men's doubles

Mixed team

Medal table

References
Men's doubles World Champions
Men's singles World Champions
Mixed teams World Champions
Women's singles World Champions

FIL World Luge Championships
1997 in luge
1997 in Austrian sport
Luge in Austria